Doog Dara is an administrative unit known as "Union Council" of Upper Dir District in the Khyber Pakhtunkhwa province of Pakistan.
Doog dara is a remote area of Dir. which is located in east of chitral district. its 25 villages here in this area. the people of this area are mostly highly educated. "Bar doog" the center of this area.

Upper Dir is administratively subdivided into six tehsils which contain a total of 28 Union Councils. Upper Dir is represented in the National Assembly and Provincial Assembly by one elected MNA and three elected MPAs respectively. People of various Sects live here brotherly e.g Kattani, Roghani, Payekhel, wardag and Saadat(سید) etc.

SHRINE (مزار)OF Shiekh Akhun Baba:
The shrine of Syed Mian Ali Shah (سید میاں علی شاہ) commonly known as Shiekh Akhun Baba (شیخ اخون بابا) is in Payeen Doag. Who was a religious personality.

See also 

 Upper Dir District

External links
Khyber-Pakhtunkhwa Government website section on Lower Dir
United Nations
Hajjinfo.org Uploads
 PBS paiman.jsi.com 

Upper Dir District
Populated places in Upper Dir District
Union councils of Khyber Pakhtunkhwa
Union Councils of Upper Dir District